Chittoor revenue division is an administrative division in the Chittoor district of the Indian state of Andhra Pradesh. It is one of the 4 revenue divisions in the district with 12 mandals under its administration and its headquarters at Chittoor. The division has  1 municipal corporation.

Adminisration 
The details of the mandals and urban settlements in the division are:

History

See also 
List of revenue divisions in Andhra Pradesh
List of mandals in Andhra Pradesh
Chittoor district
Kuppam Revenue Division
Palamaner Revenue Division
Nagari Revenue Division

References

External links 

Chittoor
Revenue divisions in Andhra Pradesh